James Forrester may refer to:

James Forrester (writer) (born 1967), historical fiction pen name for Ian Mortimer
James Forrester (politician) (1937–2011), American politician from North Carolina
James H. Forrester (1870–1928), American lawyer, judge, and politician from Illinois
James Forrester (rugby union) (born 1981), rugby union player
James Forrester (basketball) (born 1989), Filipino-Canadian basketball player
James S. Forrester (cardiologist) (born 1937), American cardiologist

See also
Jamie Forrester (born 1974), footballer